Matthew 1:23 is the 23rd verse of the first chapter in the Gospel of Matthew in the New Testament. Joseph has just been informed of the nature of Jesus by an angel and in this verse the author of Matthew relates this to a quote from the Old Testament.

Content
The original Koine Greek, according to Westcott and Hort, reads:
ιδου η παρθενος εν γαστρι εξει και τεξεται υιον και καλεσουσιν το
ονομα αυτου εμμανουηλ ο εστιν μεθερμηνευομενον μεθ ημων ο θεος

In the King James Version of the Bible the text reads:
Behold, a virgin shall be with child, and shall bring forth a
son, and they shall call his name Emmanuel, which being
interpreted is, God with us.

The World English Bible translates the passage as:
"Behold, the virgin shall be with child, and shall bring
forth a son. They shall call his name Immanuel;" which is,
being interpreted, "God with us."

For a collection of other versions see BibleHub Matthew 1:23

Analysis
The quote is from Isaiah 7:14 with Matthew using the same wording as the Septuagint (LXX). The one alteration is that the phrase "they shall name" is changed to "you shall name." This switches the meaning somewhat from Immanuel being a title proclaimed by the people to a name given by Joseph. The author of Matthew still treats the name as more of a title as Joseph actually names his son Jesus. The Masoretic text has the unspecified "and shall name".

There is much debate over the meaning of Isaiah 7:14.  Most scholars today claim the Hebrew word 'almah, used in Isaiah, would more accurately be translated as young woman rather than virgin. However, the Septuagint version of Isaiah, which was translated by seventy Jewish scholars in the 2nd century BCE, and the Gospel of Matthew both use the Greek word parthenos, which unambiguously translates as virgin. Biblical scholar Margaret Barker points out that the text uses the definite article, reading ha-'almah and therefore The Virgin, an ancient title for the Holy Spirit. This view is supported by the apocryphal Gospel of the Hebrews in which Jesus refers to the Holy Spirit as his mother. For a full discussion of this debate see Virgin Birth.

Scholars have other concerns with Matthew's reference to Isaiah. France, for instance, believes that it is far more likely that Isaiah is referring to the far more immediate future. The Hebrew can even be interpreted to say that the conception in question had already taken place when Isaiah was writing.

Carter believes the real importance of this verse is in its wider context in Isaiah. He argues that the readers of Matthew would have been very familiar with Isaiah and would immediately recognize the context of this verse. The verse occurs when Judah is under threat from the Syrians. Isaiah promises that God can save Israel from this threat, but that if the Jews continue to sin the Assyrian empire will be the instrument of God's vengeance. Carter believes that Matthew is using this situation as an allegory for the time in which he was writing. Immanuel if followed will lead to salvation from the empire, in Matthew's time the Roman, but if the messiah is rebuffed that same empire will be God's instrument of punishment for the Jewish people as presented by the destruction of the temple in 70 AD.

See also
Nativity of Jesus
Related Bible parts: Isaiah 7, Luke 1

References

Further reading
Maarten J. J. Menken. "The Textual Form of the Quotation from Isaiah 7:14 in Matthew 1:23." Novum Testamentum, Vol. 43, Fasc. 2 (April 2001), pp. 144–160

01:23
Nativity of Jesus in the New Testament